Vladimír Smutný (born 13 July 1942) is a Czech cinematographer. He is an eight-time winner of the Czech Lion Award for Best Cinematography. He was also a cinematographer of Academy Award for Best Foreign Language Film winner Kolya (1996). 

His father was a photographer. His sister, Jitka Smutná, is an actress. After graduating from FAMU in Prague, he worked as an advertising photographer for Tesla Holešovice and as a camera operator for Krátký film Praha. From 1974 he worked as an assistant cinematographer. His first projects as director of photography 1980s when he worked primarily with directors Jiří Svoboda and Karel Kachyňa. Since mid-1990s he works primarily with directors Jan Svěrák and Václav Marhoul. Since 1997 he teaches at FAMU in Prague.

Selected filmography 
 Scalpel, Please (1985)
 When the Stars Were Red (1991)
 Kolya (1996)
 Lea (1997)
 Love Lies Bleeding (1999)
 Dark Blue World (2001)
 Mazaný Filip (2003)
 King of Thieves (2004)
 The Headsman (2004)
 Empties (2007)
 Tobruk (2008)
 Kooky (2010)
 Flower Buds (2011)
 Viy (2014)
 Three Brothers (2014)
 Po strništi bos (2017)
 Golden Sting (2018)
 The Painted Bird (2019)
 The Last Aristocrat (2019)

Awards and nominations
Czech Lion Award for Best Cinematography wins: Lea (1997), Dark Blue World (2001), Mazaný Filip (2003), King of Thieves (2004), Tobruk (2008), Flower Buds (2011), Po strništi bos (2017), The Painted Bird (2019)

Czech Lion Award for Best Cinematography nominations: Kolya (1996), Empties (2007), Kooky (2010), Three Brothers (2014), Golden Sting (2018)

References

External links 

1942 births
Living people
Czech cinematographers
Mass media people from Prague
Academy of Performing Arts in Prague alumni
Academic staff of the Academy of Performing Arts in Prague